Lilliput was a small-format British monthly magazine of humour, short stories, photographs and the arts, founded in 1937 by the photojournalist Stefan Lorant. The first issue came out in July and it was sold shortly after to Edward Hulton, when editorship was taken over by Tom Hopkinson in 1940: his assistant editor from 1941 to 1948 was Kaye Webb. During the 1950s Lilliput was edited by Jack Hargreaves. It had a reputation for publishing what were, for the time, fairly daring photographs of female nudes.

Contributors included H. E. Bates, Gordon Beckles, Sir Max Beerbohm, James Boswell, Nigel Balchin (author), Bill Brandt, Brassaï, Patrick Campbell, Barbara Comyns, C.E.M. Joad, Aleister Crowley, Robert Doisneau, Dominick Elwes, Ronald Ferns, C. S. Forester, John Glashan, Zoltán Glass, Sydney Jacobson, Robert Graves, Michael Heath, Constant Lambert, Ergy Landau, Nancy Mitford, Stephen Potter, V. S. Pritchett, E. Arnot Robertson, Murray Sayle, Ronald Searle, Sir Sacheverell Sitwell, and Ylla. In August 1960 it was absorbed into Men Only (which only later became pornographic).

The first 147 issues (until late 1949) had covers illustrated by Walter Trier with each design depicting a man, a woman, and a small Scottish Terrier dog in various situations and periods.

Lilliput Review, an American periodical that started in 1989, is unrelated.

Reading

Bennett, Richard, ed. The Bedside Lilliput. London: Hulton, 1950. Content from 1937–49.
Lilliput: Walter Trier's World. Tokyo: Pie, 2004.  Presents 99 of Trier's covers for Lilliput; text in both Japanese and English.
The Lilliput Annual
Webb, Kaye, ed. Lilliput Goes to War. London: Hutchinson, 1985.

Notes

Magazines established in 1937
Magazines disestablished in 1960
Defunct magazines published in the United Kingdom
Monthly magazines published in the United Kingdom
Photography in the United Kingdom
Photojournalistic magazines
1937 establishments in the United Kingdom
1960 disestablishments in the United Kingdom